Alfredo Ruanova, (November 10, 1919 – January 1, 1977) was an Argentine writer, screenwriter and film producer.

Filmography 

 1977 La obertura
 1976 The Kids Grow Up
 1974 Satanás de todos los horrores (screenplay)
 1973 El barón de Brankován, El exterminador (TV Mini Series) (3 episodes)
 1973 The Man and the Beast (adaptation)
 1972 Basuras humanas (story - adaptation)
 1972 Me enamoré sin darme cuenta
 1972 Todos los pecados del mundo (as Alfredo Díaz Ruanova)
 1971 En estas camas nadie duerme
 1971 The Professor (adaptation)
 1971 Los corrompidos
 1970 La buscona (story - adaptation)
 1970 Su precio... unos dólares (story)
 1970 Peach Blossom
 1969 Los siete proscritos (writer)
 1969 Mujeres de medianoche (adaptation) / (screenplay)
 1969 Las impuras (screenplay)
 1969 Con licencia para matar (screenplay)
 1969 El hijo pródigo (story - adaptation)
 1969 Arriba las manos Texano (adaptation)
 1969 Una horca para el Texano (adaptation)
 1969 Muñecas peligrosas (screenplay)
 1968 Pasaporte a la muerte (screenplay) / (story)
 1968 Cinco en la cárcel (writer)
 1968 The Bed (adaptation)
 1968 Los amores de Juan Charrasqueado (adaptation)
 1968 Blue Demon: Destructor of Spies (story and screenplay)
 1968 A Woman Possessed (adaptation) / (screenplay)
 1968 El corrido del hijo desobediente (writer)
 1968 4 contra el crimen (screenplay)
 1968 Esclava del deseo (writer)
 1968 Báñame mi amor (writer)
 1967 Pasión oculta (adaptation) / (story)
 1967 Amanecí en tus brazos (adaptation)
 1967 El asesino se embarca
 1967 Rocambole contra la secta del escorpión (story and screenplay)
 1967 Rocambole contra las mujeres arpías (story & screenplay)
 1967 La perra
 1966 Planet of the Female Invaders (screenplay) / (story)
 1966 El secreto del texano (adaptation) / (story)
 1966 Vuelve el Texano (adaptation) / (story)
 1966 Sangre en el Bravo (story and adaptation)
 1966 ¡Viva Benito Canales!
 1966 Me cansé de rogarle
 1966 Gigantes planetarios (story and screenplay)
 1966 Muchachos impacientes
 1966 Gallo corriente, gallo valiente (story and screenplay)
 1966 Nosotros los jóvenes (story and adaptation)
 1966 La mano que aprieta (screenplay)
 1966 Los Sánchez deben morir (screenplay)
 1966 Los endemoniados del ring (story & screenplay)
 1966 El fugitivo (screenplay) / (story)
 1965 El asalto (story)
 1965 Los sheriffs de la frontera
 1965 Cada oveja con su pareja
 1965 Alma llanera (film) (story and screenplay)
 1965 The Curse of Gold (story)
 1965 Para todas hay (story and adaptation)
 1965 Neutron Battles the Karate Assassins (screenplay) / (story)
 1965 Nacidos para cantar
 1965 Canta mi corazón (screenplay) / (story)
 1965 El pueblo fantasma (screenplay) / (story)
 1965 El texano (screenplay)
 1964 Neutron vs. the Maniac (screenplay) / (story)
 1964 Shadow of the Black Hand (story and screenplay)
 1964 Las invencibles (story and adaptation)
 1964 Los hermanos Barragán (screenplay)
 1964 En la mitad del mundo
 1964 La sonrisa de los pobres (screenplay)
 1964 Las hijas del Zorro (story and adaptation)
 1964 Las dos galleras (Writer)
 1964 Dos inocentes mujeriegos (story and adaptation)
 1964 Tres muchachas de Jalisco (screenplay) / (story)
 1963 Dos alegres gavilanes (story and adaptation)
 1963 La garra del leopardo (story)
 1963 Tres palomas alborotadas (writer)
 1963 La Diosa impura (writer)
 1963 Tin-Tan el hombre mono (adaptation)
 1963 De color moreno (screenplay) / (story)
 1963 Qué bonito es querer (adaptation) / (story)
 1963 Las vengadoras enmascaradas (story and adaptation)
 1963 La huella macabra (story)
 1963 Bring Me the Vampire (adaptation)
 1963 Mi vida es una canción (writer)
 1963 Los parranderos (adaptation) / (story)
 1963 Los apuros de dos gallos (adaptation)
 1963 Aventuras de las hermanas X (story)
 1963 The Incredible Face of Dr. B (story and adaptation)
 1963 Vuelven los Argumedo (story and adaptation)
 1963 The Terrible Giant of the Snow (writer)
 1963 El tesoro del rey Salomón (story)
 1963 House of the Frights (adaptation)
 1963 Neutrón contra el Dr. Caronte (story and adaptation)
 1963 El monstruo de los volcanes (adaptation) / (story)
 1963 Dos gallos y dos gallinas (screenplay) / (story)
 1962 La sangre de Nostradamus
 1962 Genii of Darkness
 1962 Ahí vienen los Argumedo
 1962 Sangre en el ring (story and adaptation)
 1962 La entrega de Chucho el Roto
 1962 Los autómatas de la muerte (story and adaptation)
 1962 Dinamita Kid (story and adaptation)
 1962 The Witch's Mirror (screenplay) / (story)
 1962 Twist locura de la juventud
 1962 El malvado Carabel (adaptation)
 1962 Nostradamus y el destructor de monstruos (story and adaptation)
 1961 La captura de Chucho el Roto
 1961 Que me maten en tus brazos
 1961 Aventuras de Chucho el Roto
 1961 The Curse of Nostradamus (story and adaptation)
 1961 Gang Leader (story)
 1960 Neutrón, el enmascarado negro (story and adaptation)
 1960 The Phantom of the Operetta (1960 film) (story)
 1960 The Hell of Frankenstein (adaptation) / (story)
 1960 Chucho el Roto (film)
 1958 Dos basuras (writer)
 1957 La sombra de Safo
 1957 Alfonsina (film)
 1955 Vida nocturna
 1955 The Phantom of the Operetta (1955 film)
 1955 El mal amor
 1953 Del otro lado del puente (writer)
 1951 Derecho viejo

References

Bibliography 

 Manrupe, Raúl; Portela, María Alejandra (2001). A dictionary of Argentine films (1930-1995). Buenos Aires: Editorial Corregidor. ISBN 950-05-0896-6.

External links 

 

1919 births
1979 deaths
Golden Age of Mexican cinema
20th-century Argentine screenwriters
20th-century Argentine male writers
Argentine cinematographers
Argentine film directors
Argentine film producers